was a town located in Soo District, Kagoshima Prefecture, Japan.

On July 1, 2005, Takarabe, along with the towns of Ōsumi and Sueyoshi (all from Soo District), was merged to create the city of Soo and no longer exists as an independent municipality.

External links
 Official website of Soo in Japanese

Dissolved municipalities of Kagoshima Prefecture